Stefan III may refer to:

 Stefan III Branković (c. 1417 – 1476)
 Ştefan III of Moldavia (1433–1504)

 Stephen III, Duke of Bavaria (1337-1413)